John Paul Fruttero and Raven Klaasen were the defending champion but chose not to compete.
Top Seeds Juan Sebastián Cabal and Robert Farah claimed the title defeating Yuki Bhambri and Wang Chieh-fu 6–4, 6–2

Seeds

Draw

Draw

References
 Main Draw

OEC Kaohsiung - Doubles
2013 Doubles
2013 in Taiwanese tennis